Cécile Rigaux (born 20 April 1969 in Nogent sur Marne) is a former female beach volleyball player from France, who represented her native country at the 2000 Summer Olympics. Partnering Anabelle Prawerman she claimed the silver medal at the 1999 European Championships.

Playing partners
 Arcadia Berjonneau
 Anabelle Prawerman
 Marie Tari

References

External links
 
 
 

1969 births
Living people
French beach volleyball players
Beach volleyball players at the 2000 Summer Olympics
Olympic beach volleyball players of France
Women's beach volleyball players